Daniel Casares (born 1980) is a Spanish flamenco guitarist and composer. He has recorded six solo albums, such as Duende flamenco (1999), La Madrugá (2001), Corazón de tu alma (2004), Caballero (2007), El Ladrón del Agua (2010) and Picassares (2015).

Early life 
Daniel Casares was born in 1980 in Estepona, Málaga.

Career 
He started his music career by participating in the project A la Guitarra de Estepona, a recording on which he appeared along with other artists. Daniel Casares produced his first solo CD, Duende Flamenco in 1999, followed by La Madruga (2001) and Corazón de tu alma (2004). He released his fourth solo album, Caballero (2007), which was recorded in Málaga, Spain and has collaborations with Pitingo and El Güito.

In 2010, Daniel Casares was the only artist chosen to represent European culture at the media launch gala at Expo 2010, held in Shanghai, China.

In 2014, Casares released his album, La Luna de Alejandra (2014), which includes his version of "El concierto de Aranjuez", by Joaquín Rodrigo, and his first symphonic composition, "La Luna de Alejandra", dedicated to his daughter. Daniel Casares has recorded with the Philharmonic Orchestra, directed by Arturo Diez Boscovich, who has also collaborated in "La Luna de Alejandra", together with José Miguel Ébora.

He has collaborated with artists such as Alejandro Sanz, Antonio Orozco, José Mercé, Dulce Pontes, Pasión Vega, Toquinho, Chucho Valdés, Lulo Pérez and Miguel Poveda. He also composed music for the 2010 Spanish film El Discípulo, by Universal Pictures.

Discography

CD's and albums

Filmography 
 Cecilia Bartoli: The Barcelona Concert, (2008)
 El Discípulo (The Disciple), (2010)
 Buenafuente, (2011) 
 The Fury of a Patient Man, (2016)

Awards and recognition 
Casares won the National Bordón Minero Guitar Prize at the age of 16 years. He is the recipient of Nacional del Primer Concurso de Guitarra in Jaén, Spain, the 37th Festival del Cante de las Miñas de la Union in Murcia and the Thomson Music Best Artiste of the Year Award in 2000. Casares was awarded the Ace Award from the Association of Latin Entertainment Critics, New York City after his performance at the Thalia Spanish Theatre in New York in March 2004.

References

External links 

 Official website
 
 
 Daniel Casares on Spotify

Spanish flamenco guitarists
Spanish male guitarists
Living people
1980 births
Flamenco guitarists
21st-century male musicians